Hälleviksstrand is a locality situated in Orust Municipality, Västra Götaland County, Sweden with 214 inhabitants in 2010.

Hälleviksstrand is often locally called Strana and is a fishing town. 2015 Hälleviksstrand had a population of less than 200 inhabitants.

History 
It's unknown when Hälleviksstrand was founded, the first written sources of it were found in 1617. Fishermen set up camps along its coast and started constructing lodgings from there. During the 1700's and the herring period many farmers from the hinterland of Orust started to move to the coast and to Hälleviksstrand to fish for herring. At the end of the 1800's the town grew with a new hot bathhouse and a borading house. Soon the mountain behind the coast was also being built on. In the beginning of the 1900's a shipyard was constructed and Hälleviksstrand was flourishing.

References

External links 
 http://www.halleviksstrand.se/ retrieved 2021-12-19.

Populated places in Västra Götaland County
Populated places in Orust Municipality